Gull-Maj Norin (20 April 1913 – 27 November 1997) was a Danish actress of stage and film who performed in Denmark and Sweden during the 1930s and 1940s. She is best known for her leading role as the suspected serial murderer in the 1944 film noir thriller Melody of Murder.

Early life
Norin was born in Helsingborg, Sweden, the daughter of the Swedish actress Ann-Sofi Norin (1893–1942), then moved to Denmark when she was 10.

Career
At the age of 18, Norin appeared on stage in a production of Lysistrata at Copenhagen's Riddersalen Theater. The following year Norin landed a small role as a choirgirl in Emanuel Gregers's comedy film Odds 777. During the next several years she performed as a cabaret singer and stage actress in theaters in Denmark and Sweden.

Following several small film roles, she gained international recognition as the heroine in George Schnéevoigt's melodrama Fredløs (Outlawed). Hollywood director Josef von Sternberg saw her performance and asked Norin to replace the injured Merle Oberon in his film I, Claudius. She agreed and signed a contract with Alexander Korda, but the outbreak of World War II prevented the production. Norin remained in Scandinavia, working for ASA Film company in such movies as De Tre, måske fire, Nordhavets mænd and with Max Hansen in Wienerbarnet. With her Swedish background, she also made several films in Sweden.

In 1942, Norin stated that she would only do films and, preferably, only with Danish director Bodil Ipsen. Norin's finest performance came in Ipsen's 1944 crime thriller Mordets Melodi, in which Norin played a cabaret singer suspected of serial murder. The film is cited as a classic in Denmark and considered the first Danish film noir thriller.

Norin made only three more films, ending with 1947's Mani. After her brief career, she withdrew from public performance, later stating simply, "I didn't want to anymore." The Danish film critic Morten Piil wrote that Norin's acting created a "different female type with figures filled with tragic undertones and vague suffering."

Personal life
Norin married film and television director Søren Melson in 1940. They remained married until his death in 1984. Norin died on 27 November 1997. She is buried in Mariebjerg Cemetery in Gentofte.

Partial filmography

Odds 777 (1932) - Korpige
 Two Men and a Widow (1933) - Karin Lundvall
Karl Fredrik regerar (Karl Fredrik Reigns) (1934) - Lena
Sången om den eldröda blomman (Man's Way with Women) (1934) - Maikki
Fredløs (1935) - Aino
 Unfriendly Relations (1936) - May, hennes fosterdotter
 Shipwrecked Max (1936) - Ann-Kathrine
Det begyndte ombord (1937) - Else Fischer
De tre, måske fire (1939) - En Svensk dame
Nordhavets mænd (1939) - Aino Flatø
Tante Cramers testamente (1941) - Karine Lemberg
Wienerbarnet (1941) - Else Sibone
Et skud før midnat (1942) - Lili Holme
Ballade i Nyhavn (1942) - Anna-Lisa
Alle mand på dæk (1942) - Ellinor Berggren
En herre i kjole og hvidt (A Gentleman in Top Hat and Tails) (1942) - Gloria Brandt
For folkets fremtid (1943) - Speaker
Drama på slottet (1943) - Justine Rosenkrantz
Mordets Melodi (Melody of Murder) (1944) - Kabaretsangerinde Odette Margot / Sonja
I går og i morgen (1945) - Dansende gæst i natklub
Så mødes vi hos Tove (We Meet at Tove's) (1946) - Gerd
Mani (1947) - Barbera Frank (final film role)

References

External links
 Den Danske Film Database (In Danish)
 
 

Danish film actresses
Danish stage actresses
People from Helsingborg
1913 births
1997 deaths
20th-century Danish actresses
Swedish emigrants to Denmark
Burials at Mariebjerg Cemetery